This is a list of New Zealand One-day International cricketers. A One Day International, or an ODI, is an international cricket match between two representative teams, each having ODI status, as determined by the International Cricket Council (ICC). An ODI differs from Test matches in that the number of overs per team is limited, and that each team has only one innings. The list is arranged in the order in which each player won his first ODI cap. Where more than one player won his first ODI cap in the same match, those players are listed alphabetically by surname.

Key

Players
Statistics are correct as of 24 January 2023.

Notes:
1 Chris Cairns, Stephen Fleming and Daniel Vettori also played ODI cricket for ICC World XI. Only their records for New Zealand are given above. 
2 Luke Ronchi also played ODI cricket for Australia. Only his records for New Zealand are given above.
3 Mark Chapman also played ODI cricket for Hong Kong. Only his records for New Zealand are given above.

See also
One Day International
New Zealand cricket team
List of New Zealand Test cricketers
List of New Zealand Twenty20 International cricketers
List of New Zealand sportspeople

External links
Howstat

References

ODI
New Zealand